Andrea Rodebaugh Huitrón (born 8 October 1966) is a Mexican professional football coach and former player who is the current manager of Tijuana in the Liga MX Femenil.

Life
She was born in 1966 in Mexico City.

She played as a midfielder and have played for teams in the United States, France and Japan. Perhaps the best Mexican female footballer of the 1990s, she was the captain of the Mexico women's national football team during that decade, leading the team at the 1999 FIFA Women's World Cup.

In 2017 she was confirmed as the lead for the Tijuana women's team. This announcement removed Marbella Ibarra who had been credited with creating the team.

Andrea has 2 kids, Anahi and Diego Sandoval.

References

1966 births
Living people
Footballers from Mexico City
Mexican people of German descent
Mexican women's footballers
Women's association football midfielders
California Golden Bears women's soccer players
Mexico women's international footballers
1999 FIFA Women's World Cup players
Mexican expatriate women's footballers
Mexican expatriate sportspeople in the United States
Expatriate women's soccer players in the United States
Mexican expatriate sportspeople in France
Expatriate women's footballers in France
Mexican expatriate sportspeople in Japan
Expatriate women's footballers in Japan
Mexican football managers
Women's association football managers
Liga MX Femenil managers
Mexican footballers